Gmina Piszczac is a rural gmina (administrative district) in Biała Podlaska County, Lublin Voivodeship, in eastern Poland.

Villages
Gmina Piszczac contains the villages and settlements of Chotyłów, Dąbrowica Mała, Dobrynka, Janówka, Kolonia Piszczac I, Kolonia Piszczac II, Kolonia Piszczac III, Kościeniewicze, Nowy Dwór, Ortel Królewski Drugi, Ortel Królewski Pierwszy, Piszczac, Piszczac-Kolonia, Połoski, Połoski Nowe, Połoski Stare, Popiel, Trojanów, Wólka Kościeniewicka, Wyczółki, Zahorów and Zalutyń.

Neighbouring gminas
Gmina Piszczac is bordered by the gminas of Biała Podlaska, Kodeń, Łomazy, Terespol, Tuczna and Zalesie.

References

External links
Polish official population figures 2006

Gminas in Lublin Voivodeship
Biała Podlaska County